Jad Ahmad Noureddine (born 27 February 1992) is a Lebanese professional footballer who plays as a centre-back.

Noureddine began his senior career in 2009 at Lebanese Premier League side Nejmeh, before moving to Shabab Sahel in 2011. Noureddine moved to Indonesia, to Pusamania Borneo and Arema FC, in 2016 and 2017 respectively. He returned to Lebanon, joining Safa in 2017, before moving to Malaysia at Perak in 2018. In 2018 Noureddine returned to Safa, before joining AFC Cup title-holders Ahed in 2020. He moved on loan to Al-Ahli in Bahrain and Perak in Malaysia.

Noureddine represented Lebanon at both youth and senior level; he made his senior international debut in 2016, and played three games until 2017.

Club career

Indonesia 
Jad played for Indonesian sides Pusamania Borneo and Arema FC in 2016 and 2017. Because of an ACL injury that he suffered in 2016, while playing for Pusamania Borneo, Jad Noureddine went back to his home country, Lebanon, to take medical treatment—there were no specialists in Indonesia that could treat him.

Safa and Perak 
In 2017, Noureddine returned to Lebanon, signing for Safa. After playing 21 games in the 2017–18 season, scoring twice, on 4 June 2018 Noureddine joined Malaysia Super League club Perak, during the mid-season transfer window. He played eight of the nine remaining games of the 2018 season. 

On 21 December 2018, Noureddine returned to Safa on a two-and-a-half year deal. During the second half of the 2018–19 season, Noureddine played 10 league games.

Ahed 
On 9 July 2020, Noureddine joined AFC Cup champions Ahed, on a free transfer, on a five-year contract.

Loans to Al-Ahli, Perak and Akhaa 
Noureddine moved to Bahraini Premier League side Al-Ahli on 29 November 2020, on a five-month loan. He made his debut on 10 December, in a 1–1 draw to Malkiya. Noureddine helped his side beat Hidd in the Bahraini King's Cup semi-final to qualify to the final against Riffa, which he lost.

On 31 May 2021, Ahed loaned out Noureddine to Perak in the Malaysia Super League on a six-month deal. On 23 February 2022, Noureddine was loaned to Akhaa Ahli Aley until the end of the season.

After returning to Ahed from his loan spell, Noureddine terminated his contract by mutual consent.

International career
Noureddine has represented Lebanon internationally at youth level since age 14, and was captain of the under-23s. He was first called up for the senior team in September 2016 for a friendly against Afghanistan as an unused substitute. He made his debut on 10 November, in a friendly against Palestine.

Honours 
Arema FC
 Indonesia President's Cup: 2017

Perak FA
 Malaysia Cup: 2018

Al-Ahli
 Bahraini King's Cup runner-up: 2020–21

Ahed
 Lebanese Elite Cup: 2022

References

External links

 
 
  (2017–2018; 2021–present)
  (2011–2021)
 
 

Living people
1992 births
People from Bint Jbeil District
Lebanese footballers
Association football defenders
Association football central defenders
Al Shabab Al Arabi Club Beirut players
FC Dinamo București players
Nejmeh SC players
Shabab Al Sahel FC players
Borneo F.C. players
Arema F.C. players
Safa SC players
Perak F.C. players
Al Ahed FC players
Al-Ahli Club (Manama) players
Akhaa Ahli Aley FC players
Lebanese Premier League players
Liga 1 (Indonesia) players
Malaysia Super League players
Bahraini Premier League players
Lebanon youth international footballers
Lebanon international footballers
Lebanese expatriate footballers
Lebanese expatriate sportspeople in Romania
Lebanese expatriate sportspeople in Indonesia
Lebanese expatriate sportspeople in Malaysia
Lebanese expatriate sportspeople in Bahrain
Expatriate footballers in Romania
Expatriate footballers in Indonesia
Expatriate footballers in Malaysia
Expatriate footballers in Bahrain